Remus Bogdan Chipirliu (born 21 July 1992) is a Romanian professional footballer who plays as a striker for Liga II club CSA Steaua București.

Career statistics

Club

Statistics accurate as of match played 28 May 2017

Honours
Juventus București
Liga II: 2016–17

Gloria Buzău
Liga III: 2018–19

Steaua București
Liga III: 2020–21

References

External links

 
 

1992 births
Living people
Romanian footballers
Association football forwards
Liga I players
Liga II players
ASC Oțelul Galați players
FCM Dunărea Galați players
ASC Daco-Getica București players
FC Astra Giurgiu players
FC Gloria Buzău players
CSA Steaua București footballers
Sportspeople from Galați